The Youngs Timor-Leste is the national team of Timor-Leste and is controlled by the Federação de Futebol de Timor-Leste. East Timor has never had success on the international stage. They are currently one of the weakest teams in the world. East Timor joined FIFA on 12 September 2005.

Kits
Timor-Leste 's kit is a red jersey, red shorts and red socks. Their away kit is with a white jersey with black shorts and red or white socks. The kits are currently manufactured by Adidas and Nike. Timor-Leste first kit is under Tiger, when the team play for the 2004 Tiger Cup. The first kit is red jersey, black shorts and red sock and their away kit is white jersey with two black sleeves, black short and white socks.

Competition records

AFC U-22 Championship record

Hassanal Bolkiah Trophy record

Squad

Current squad
The following players were called up for the 2018 Hassanal Bolkiah Trophy in Brunei. Players marked with an asterisk (*) were over age for this competition.

Head coach:  Eduardo Pereira

List of Coaches

Stadium

 East Timor National Stadium    (2002-present)

References

External links
 Profile at FIFA.com
 Profile at the-AFC.com
 Profile at AFF Suzuki Cup Site
 Profile at AFF Site
 Profile at National-football-teams.com

u21
Football